Walsh was an electoral district of the House of Assembly in the Australian state of South Australia from 1985 to 1993. It succeeded the seat of Ascot Park. It was mainly succeeded by the seat of Elder.

Member

Election results

References

External links
1985 & 1989 election boundaries, page 18 & 19

Former electoral districts of South Australia
1985 establishments in Australia
1993 disestablishments in Australia
Constituencies established in 1985
Constituencies disestablished in 1993